Kang Yu-chan (born December 31, 1997), also known as Chan  is a South Korean singer and actor. He debuted as a member of A.C.E in 2017. In the same year, he joined the survival program The Unit, in which he finished in ninth place and became a member of the project group UNB. As an actor, he gained recognition by playing the role of Son Bo-hyun in the web series Twenty-Twenty.

Career

Pre-debut
Kang Yu-chan was a former JYP Entertainment trainee before joining Beat Interactive.

2017–present: Debut with A.C.E and UNB
Kang debuted as a member of A.C.E on May 23, 2017, with the single "Cactus". In the same year, he participated in the survival show The Unit: Idol Rebooting Project alongside fellow A.C.E member Jun. On February 10, 2018, Kang placed 9th with a total of 74,367 votes in the final episode thus making him included in final group lineup. On April 7, 2018, he officially debuted as a member of UNB with the release of their first EP, Boyhood. On November 5, 2018, he sang "Maybe" for the South Korean television drama My Healing Love with Kim Byeong-kwan. Since then, he has featured on several soundtracks for television dramas such as The Game: Towards Zero, Beautiful Love, Wonderful Life, Welcome etc.

In March 2020, Kang joined the main cast of the web series Twenty-Twenty where he played Son Bo-hyun. His performance in the series was well-received, earning him increased recognition.

In 2022, Kang portrayed the role of Bang Yu-chan in Playlist's web drama series Mimicus.

On August 16, 2022, Chan enlisted for his military service as an active duty soldier. He will return to his entertainment career on February 15, 2024.

Discography

Soundtrack appearances

Filmography

Web series

Television series

Television shows

References

External links

 Kang Yu-chan at Beat Interactive

1997 births
Living people
K-pop singers
Reality show winners
South Korean male idols
People from Jeju Province
Swing Entertainment artists
South Korean male television actors
21st-century South Korean male actors
21st-century South Korean male  singers
South Korean male web series actors
Japanese-language singers of South Korea